Bahalkeh-ye Bayram Akhund (also Romanized as Bahalkeh-ye Bāyrām Ākhūnd; also known as Bahalkeh-ye Bahrām Ākhūnd) is a village in Sheykh Musa Rural District, in the Central District of Aqqala County, Golestan Province, Iran. At the 2006 census, its population was 582, in 127 families.

References 

Populated places in Aqqala County